Sleepwalk may refer to:

 Sleepwalking or somnambulism, a sleep disorder
 Sleepwalk (film), a 1986 American film directed by Sara Driver
 Sleepwalk, a 1991 novel by John Saul

Music
 "Sleep Walk", an instrumental by Santo & Johnny, 1959
 "Sleepwalk" (song), by Ultravox, 1980
 "Sleepwalk", a song by Christian Death from Catastrophe Ballet, 1984
 Sleepwalk, a 2007 album by Astral
 Sleepwalk, a 1981 album by Larry Carlton
 Sleepwalk, a 2000 album by Matrix

See also
 Sleepwalker (disambiguation)
 Sleepwalking (disambiguation)